Glutathione S-transferase A4, also known as GSTA4, is an enzyme which in humans is encoded by the GSTA4 gene.

Function 

Cytosolic and membrane-bound forms of glutathione S-transferase are encoded by two distinct supergene families. These enzymes are involved in cellular defense against toxic, carcinogenic, and pharmacologically active electrophilic compounds. At present, eight distinct classes of the soluble cytoplasmic mammalian glutathione S-transferases have been identified: alpha, kappa, mu, omega, pi, sigma, theta and zeta. This gene encodes a glutathione S-transferase belonging to the alpha class. The alpha class genes, which are located in a cluster on chromosome 6, are highly related and encode enzymes with glutathione peroxidase activity that function in the detoxification of lipid peroxidation products.

GSTA4 shows very high activity with reactive carbonyl compounds such as alk-2-enals. GSTA4 is highly effective in catalyzing the conjugate addition of reduced glutathione to 4-hydroxynonenal, an important product of peroxidative degradation of arachidonic acid and a commonly used biomarker for oxidative damage in tissue.

Clinical significance 

Reactive electrophiles produced by oxidative metabolism have been linked to a number of degenerative diseases including Parkinson's disease, Alzheimer's disease, cataract formation, and atherosclerosis hence reduced expression of the GSTA4 enzyme may have pathophysiological consequences. The expression of this gene is decreased drastically among burn and trauma victims.

References

Further reading